Bachorza  is a settlement in the administrative district of Gmina Ryn, within Giżycko County, Warmian-Masurian Voivodeship, in northern Poland.

Before 1945 the settlement was part of Germany (East Prussia) and known as Wiesenthal.

References

Bachorza